Banksia leptophylla is a species of shrub that is endemic to the south-west of Western Australia. It has narrow linear leaves, heads of yellow or pale brown flowers with a yellow or purple style and later, up to eight egg-shaped follicles in each head.

Description

Taxonomy and naming
Banksia leptophylla was first formally described in 1981 by Alex George in the journal Nuytsia. George's description was based on Carl Meisner's Banksia pinifolia, an illegitimate name because the name had already been used by Salisbury for a different species. The lectotype was an earlier specimen collected by James Drummond. The specific epithet (leptophylla) is derived from the ancient Greek words leptos, meaning "fine" or "slender" and phyllon, meaning "a leaf".

In 1988, George described two varieties of this species in the journal Nuytsia and the names are accepted by the Australian Plant Census:
 Banksia leptophylla var. melletica A.S.George that flowers in winter and has a shorter perianth than the autonym.

Before Alex George's revision of 1981, this species was labelled informally as B. sphaerocarpa var. pinifolia or var. major.

Distribution and habitat
Variety leptophylla grows in shrubland and kwongan between Tathra National Park and Moora and var. melletica grows in kwongan near the coast between Kalbarri and Guilderton.

Ecology
Banksia leptophylla is one of five Banksia species, all closely related to B. sphaerocarpa, that have highly unusual flower nectar. Whereas other Banksia species produce nectar that is clear and watery, the nectar of these species is pale yellow initially, but gradually becomes darker and thicker, changing to a thick, olive-green mucilage within one to two days of secretion, and eventually becoming "an almost black, gelatinous lump adhering to the base of the flowers". It was first noted by Byron Lamont in 1980; he attributed it to cyanobacteria that feed off the nectar sugars. Noting that many of these cyanobacteria had heterocysts, he speculated that they aid the plant by fixing atmospheric nitrogen, which is then washed off the flower heads by rain, and absorbed by the proteoid root mat. This purported symbiosis was investigated by Barrett and Lamont in 1985, but no evidence of nitrogen fixing was found. Further investigation by Markey and Lamont in 1996 suggested that the discolouration is not caused by cyanobacteria or other microorganisms in the nectar, but is rather "a chemical phenomenon of plant origin". Their analyses indicated that the nectar had unusually high levels of sugar and free amino acids, but three of these species, including B. leptophylla, have since been shown to have normal nectar sugar compositions.

An assessment of the potential impact of climate change on B. leptophylla found that its range is unlikely to contract and may actually grow, depending on the severity of the change and how effectively the species migrates into newly habitable areas.

Conservation status
Both varieties of B. leptophylla are classified as "not threatened" by the Western Australian Government Department of Parks and Wildlife.

Notes

References 

leptophylla
Eudicots of Western Australia
Endemic flora of Western Australia
Plants described in 1981
Taxa named by Alex George